Datunashvili is a Georgian surname. Notable people with the surname include:

 Levan Datunashvili (born 1983), Georgian rugby union player
 Zurabi Datunashvili (born 1991), Georgian sport wrestler

Georgian-language surnames